Austrostipa is a primarily Australian genus of plants in the grass family, commonly called speargrass.

The genus includes species formerly included in the genus Stipa. All known species are native to Australia, most of them found nowhere else. One species (A. variabilis) is, however, found in South Africa as well as in Australia, and two species (A. setacea + A. stipoides) are native to Australia and New Zealand. The group likely originated in Australia approximately 20 million years ago.

 Species

References

 
Bunchgrasses of Australasia
Poaceae genera